The initials ICRU can stand for
 Iceland Crisis Response Unit
 International Commission on Radiation Units and Measurements